Galleridia is a genus of moths of the family Erebidae. The genus was erected by George Hampson in 1896.

Species
Galleridia atrisigna Hampson, 1896 Sri Lanka to Yemen
Galleridia fuscizonea Hampson, 1896 Sri Lanka
Galleridia suffumata Hacker & Sadie, 2016 Arabia

References

Calpinae